Davy Roef (born 6 February 1994) is a Belgian footballer who plays as a goalkeeper for Gent.

Club career

Early career
Roef spent time with several clubs in his youth, such as Beerschot A.C., KFCO Beerschot Wilrijk, and Anderlecht.

Anderlecht
Roef was a graduate of the Anderlecht academy, and made his senior league debut in a 2-1 loss to Mechelen. He replaced an injured Silvio Proto after 39 minutes.

Deportivo La Coruña (Loan)
In January 2017, Roef was loaned out to Deportivo La Coruña. He struggled to break into the team while at Deportivo however, and it got worse for him after suffering an ankle injury in training. He made one league appearance for them, coming on 20 May 2017 in a 3-0 win over Las Palmas.

Waasland-Beveren (Loan)
Following the expiry of his loan in June, Roef was loaned out again, this time to Waasland-Beveren. He made his league debut on 26 August 2017 in a 1-0 loss to Sint-Truiden.

International career
Roef has been capped at U19 level by Belgium twice. He was called up to the senior Belgium squad for the UEFA Nations League matches against Denmark and Iceland in September 2020.

Career statistics

References

External links

1994 births
Living people
Belgian footballers
Belgian expatriate footballers
Belgium under-21 international footballers
Belgium youth international footballers
R.S.C. Anderlecht players
Deportivo de La Coruña players
S.K. Beveren players
K.A.A. Gent players
Belgian Pro League players
La Liga players
Expatriate footballers in Spain
Belgian expatriate sportspeople in Spain
Association football goalkeepers
Footballers from Antwerp